Saint-Martin-la-Plaine is a commune in the Loire department in central France.

Population

Twin towns
Saint-Martin-la-Plaine is twinned with:

  Igensdorf, Germany, since 1992

See also
Communes of the Loire department

References

Communes of Loire (department)